Nigel Codrington (born 5 July 1979) is a Guyanese former footballer whose last club was Camptown Georgetown in the GFF Super League.
He is the all-time top scorer of Guyana with 18 goals.

International goals
Scores and results list Guyana's goal tally first.

References

External links
 

1979 births
Living people
Guyanese footballers
Guyana international footballers
Guyanese expatriate footballers
Association football forwards
TT Pro League players
Morvant Caledonia United players
San Juan Jabloteh F.C. players
Expatriate footballers in Barbados
Guyanese expatriate sportspeople in Barbados
Notre Dame SC players
Guyanese expatriate sportspeople in Trinidad and Tobago
Cleveland City Stars players
USL Second Division players
Expatriate footballers in Trinidad and Tobago
Expatriate soccer players in the United States
Guyanese expatriate sportspeople in the United States
Sportspeople from Georgetown, Guyana